The Memorial for Yelü Yanning (耶律延寧) is the oldest known Khitan inscription of significant length and for now the oldest major written attestation of a Mongolic (or Para-Mongolic) language. Dated 986, it is written in the Mongolic Khitan language using the Khitan large script. With 19 lines and 271 characters it was found in 1964 at Baimu Mountain, Chaoyang County, Liaoning, China. and is now kept in the Liaoning Province Museum, China.  The Khitan word 'jau' (hundred) which occurs in line 13 of the upper-right Khitan section of the inscription and which is written with the large script character 百 is one of the earliest fully deciphered Mongolic words preserved in a Mongolic inscription.

Yelü Yanning 
Yelü Yanning is not mentioned in the Liaoshi or other Khitan historical documents. The discovery of his memorial inscription in 1964 gave the first information about him. Yelü Yanning (946-985) was a high ranking Khitan military officer of the Liao dynasty.  Yelü Yanning's family belonged to the imperial household and had a place in the horizontal gers of the Khitan Khan. His great-grandfather Gaoligu, grandfather Zhiwubu and his father Sage were all widely known as brave and expert warriors who repeatedly accomplished meritorious deeds. His father Sage was given the title "Imperial Tutor Honorable Duke". When the Jingzong Emperor Yelü Xian succeeded to the throne Yelü Yanning was recruited as a jinshi (close supporter). Yelü Yanning was gradually given various titles such as "State-defending Righteous Outstanding Minister", "Sublime Fortunate Minister", "High Inspector", "Imperial Censor", "State High Support" and "Great General".

He was given 500 families in Qishui county. Yanning scrupulously performed his guard duties, always ensuring the Emperor's safety and earning the deep trust of the Jingzong Emperor and Empress Xiaochuo. After the Jingzong Emperor died in 982, Empress Xiao was regent. During this time the Zubu confederacy (Keraites) in central Mongolia raised armies against the Liao dynasty and pushed eastwards, profoundly affecting the Niaogu, Dilie, Shiwei (Mongols) and others. Emperor Shengzong Yelü Longxu and Empress Xiao sent Yelü Yanning to pacify the northern borderland. Yelü Yanning reached the area of present-day Hulunbuir in Inner Mongolia near the source of the Heilongjiang river and continued to the Kherlen River in present-day eastern Mongolia where he met with success. He died in the third year of the Tonghe period (30 December 985) due to complications of his wounds.

See also
 List of Khitan inscriptions

References

Citations

Sources

External links 

Yelu Yanning
10th-century inscriptions
Liao dynasty
986 establishments
Yelü clan